The Symposium is a philosophical text by Plato, dated . It depicts a friendly contest of extemporaneous speeches given by a group of notable men attending a banquet. The men include the philosopher Socrates, the general and political figure Alcibiades, and the comic playwright Aristophanes. The speeches are to be given in praise of Eros, the god of love and desire.

In the Symposium, Eros is recognized both as erotic love and as a phenomenon capable of inspiring courage, valor, great deeds and works, and vanquishing man's natural fear of death. It is seen as transcending its earthly origins and attaining spiritual heights. This extraordinary elevation of the concept of love raises a question of whether some of the most extreme extents of meaning might be intended as humor or farce. Eros is almost always translated as "love", and the English word has its own varieties and ambiguities that provide additional challenges to the effort to understand the Eros of ancient Athens.

This dialogue is one of Plato's major works, and is appreciated for both its philosophical content and its literary qualities.

Literary form
The Symposium is a dialogue – a form used by Plato in more than 30 works – however unlike in many of his other works the majority of it is a series of speeches from different characters. Socrates is renowned for his dialectic approach to knowledge (often referred to as the Socratic Method), which involves posing questions that encourage others to think deeply about what they care about and articulate their ideas. In the Symposium, the dialectic exists among the speeches: in seeing how the ideas conflict from speech-to-speech, and in the effort to resolve the contradictions and see the philosophy that underlies them all. Some of the characters are historical, but this is not a report of historical events. There is no reason to doubt that they were composed entirely by Plato. The reader, understanding that Plato was not governed by the historical record, can read the Symposium, and ask why the author, Plato, arranged the story the way he did, and what he meant by including the various aspects of setting, composition, characters, and theme, etc.

For a very long time, it was widely believed that Socrates was presented in the dialogues by his admiring disciple, Plato, as an ideal philosopher and ideal human being. It was thought that what Socrates said was what Plato agreed with or approved of. Then in the late 20th century, another interpretation began to challenge that idea. This new idea considers that the Symposium is intended to criticize Socrates and his philosophy, and to reject certain aspects of his behavior. It also considers that Socratic philosophy may have lost touch with the actual individual as it devoted itself to abstract principles.

The above view, attributed to Martha Nussbaum, can, however, be challenged in favor of the traditional one. The portrayal of Socrates in the Symposium (for instance his refusal to give in to Alcibiades' sexual advances) is consistent with the account of Socrates put forward by Xenophon and the theories that Socrates defends throughout the Platonic corpus. Plato shows off his master as a man of high moral standards, unstirred by baser urges and fully committed to the study and practice of proper self-government in both individuals and communities (the so-called "royal science"). The dialogue's ending contrasts Socrates' intellectual and emotional self-mastery with Alcibiades' debauchery and lack of moderation to explain the latter's reckless political career, disastrous military campaigns, and eventual demise. Alcibiades is corrupted by his physical beauty and its advantages; he ultimately fails to ascend to the Form of Beauty through philosophy.

One critic, James Arieti, considers that the Symposium resembles a drama, with emotional and dramatic events occurring especially when Alcibiades crashes the banquet. Arieti suggests that it should be studied more as a drama, with a focus on character and actions, and less as an exploration of philosophical ideas. This suggests that the characters speak, as in a play, not as the author, but as themselves. This theory, Arieti has found, reveals how much each of the speakers of the Symposium resembles the god, Eros, that they each are describing. It may be Plato's point to suggest that when humankind talks about god, they are drawn towards creating that god in their own image.

Andrew Dalby considers the opening pages of the Symposium the best depiction in any ancient Greek source of the way texts are transmitted by oral tradition without writing.  It shows how an oral text may have no simple origin, and how it can be passed along by repeated tellings, and by different narrators, and how it can be sometimes verified, and sometimes corrupted. The story of the symposium is being told by Apollodorus to his friend.  Apollodorus was not himself at the banquet, but heard the story from Aristodemus, a man who was there.  Also, Apollodorus was able to confirm parts of the story with Socrates himself, who was one of the speakers at the banquet. A story that Socrates narrates, when it is his turn to speak, was told to Socrates by a woman named Diotima, a philosopher and a priestess.

Setting and historical context
The event depicted in the Symposium is a banquet attended by a group of men, who have come to the symposium, which was, in ancient Greece, a traditional part of the same banquet that took place after the meal, when drinking for pleasure was accompanied by music, dancing, recitals, or conversation. The setting means that the participants would be drinking wine, meaning that the men might be induced to say things they would not say elsewhere or when sober. They might speak more frankly, or take more risks, or else be prone to hubris—they might even be inspired to make speeches that are particularly heartfelt and noble. This is, of course, excluding Socrates, as Alcibiades claims in his speech that "no one has ever seen Socrates drunk" (C. Gill, p. 61). Implying that these are subjects which Socrates holds personally dear regardless, as evident elsewhere in the book as well, like with his account of the conversation between himself and Diotima of Mantinea.

Eryximachus has challenged the men to deliver, each, in turn, an encomium—in this case, a speech in praise of Love (Eros). Though other participants comply with this challenge, Socrates notably refuses to participate in such an act of praise and instead takes a very different approach to the topic. The party takes place at the house of the tragedian Agathon in Athens.

It is considered that the work was written no earlier than 385 BCE, and the party to which it makes reference has been fixed in 416 BCE, the year in which the host Agathon had the dramatic triumph mentioned in the text. The disastrous expedition to Syracuse, of which Alcibiades was a commander, took place the following year, after which Alcibiades deserted to Sparta, Athens' archenemy.

Walter Hamilton remarks that Plato takes care to portray Alcibiades and Socrates and their relationship in a way that makes it clear that Socrates had not been a bad influence on Alcibiades. Plato does this to free his teacher from the guilt of corrupting the minds of prominent youths, which had, in fact, earned Socrates the death sentence in 399 BC.

As a response to Aristophanes
Aristophanes' comedy, The Frogs (405 BC), attacks the new tragedy of Agathon and Euripides, and opposes it to the old tragedy of Aeschylus.  In The Frogs, Dionysus, the god of theatre and wine, descends into Hades and observes a heated dispute between Aeschylus and Euripides over who is the best in tragedy.  Dionysus is engaged to be the judge, and decides the outcome, not based on the merits of the two tragedians, but based on their political stance regarding the political figure, Alcibiades.  Since Aeschylus prefers Alcibiades, Dionysus declares Aeschylus the winner.

That contest provides the basic structure on which the Symposium is modeled as a kind of sequel:  In the Symposium, Agathon has just celebrated a victory the day before and is now hosting another kind of debate, this time it is between a tragedian, a comic poet, and Socrates.  At the beginning of the Symposium, Agathon asserts that "Dionysus will be the judge", and Dionysus is, though Alcibiades performs as a surrogate for the god.  So the character, Alcibiades, who was the deciding factor in the debate in The Frogs, becomes the judge in the Symposium, and he now rules in favor of Socrates, who had been attacked by Aristophanes in The Clouds.  The Symposium is a response to The Frogs, and shows Socrates winning not only over Aristophanes, who was the author of both The Frogs, and The Clouds, but also over the tragic poet who was portrayed in that comedy as the victor.

Synopsis
The dialogue's seven main characters, who deliver major speeches, are:
 Phaedrus (speech begins 178a): an Athenian aristocrat associated with the inner-circle of the philosopher Socrates, familiar from Phaedrus and other dialogues
 Pausanias (speech begins 180c): the legal expert
 Eryximachus (speech begins 186a): a physician
 Aristophanes (speech begins 189c): the eminent comic playwright
 Agathon (speech begins 195a): a tragic poet, host of the banquet, that celebrates the triumph of his first tragedy
 Socrates (speech begins 201d): the eminent philosopher and Plato's teacher
 Alcibiades (speech begins 214e): a prominent Athenian statesman, orator, and general

The story of the banquet is narrated by Apollodorus, but before the narration proper begins, it is shown that Apollodorus is telling the story to a friend of his that is not named, and also that the story of this banquet has been told before by others, as well as previously by Apollodorus himself. This section previews the story of the banquet, letting the reader know what to expect, and it provides information regarding the context and the date. The banquet was hosted by the poet Agathon to celebrate his first victory in a dramatic competition: the Dionysia of 416 BCE. Apollodorus was not present at the event, which occurred when he was a boy, but he heard the story from Aristodemus, who was present. Apollodorus later checked parts of the story with Socrates, who was also there. In this brief introductory passage, it is shown that the narrator, Apollodorus, has a reputation for being somewhat mad, that he is a passionate follower of Socrates, and that he spends his days either listening to Socrates or else telling others of what he has learned from Socrates. The story, as told by Apollodorus, then moves to the banquet at Agathon's home, where Agathon challenges each of the men to speak in praise of the Greek god, Eros.

Socrates is late to arrive because he became lost in thought on the way. When they are done eating, Eryximachus takes the suggestion made by Phaedrus, that they should all make a speech in praise of Eros, the god of love and desire. It will be a competition of speeches to be judged by Dionysus. It is anticipated that the speeches will ultimately be bested by Socrates, who speaks last.

Phaedrus starts by pointing out that Eros is the oldest of the gods, and that Eros promotes virtue in people. Next, Pausanias contrasts common desire with a "heavenly" love between an older man and a young man (before the age when his beard starts to grow), in which the two exchange sexual pleasure while the older man imparts wisdom to the younger one. He distinguishes between this virtuous love, and the love of an older man for a young (immature) boy, which he says should be forbidden on the grounds that love should be based on qualities of intelligence and virtue that are not yet part of a boy's makeup and may not develop. Eryximachus has the next speech (although he has switched with Aristophanes) and suggests that Eros encourages  "sophrosyne", or soundness of mind and character, and is not only about human behavior, but also occurs in music, medicine, and many other areas of life.

The fourth speech is from Aristophanes, who tells a comic, fantastical story about how humans were at one time two people conjoined, but this was seen as threatening to the gods, so Zeus cut everyone in half just like fish is cut in two parts. The irony in his storytelling is obvious (he praises the "confidence, courage and manliness" of males searching for males "and there is good evidence for this in the fact that only males of this type, when they are grown up, prove to be real men in politics" – which is highly ironical for such a critic of the times' politicians as Aristophanes himself).
Love is the desire we have to find our other half, in order to become whole. Agathon follows Aristophanes, and his speech sees Eros as youthful, beautiful, and wise; and as the source of all human virtues.

Before Socrates gives his speech he asks some questions of Agathon regarding the nature of love. Socrates then relates a story he was told by a wise woman called Diotima. According to her, Eros is not a god but is a spirit that mediates between humans and their objects of desire. Love itself is not wise or beautiful but is the desire for those things. Love is expressed through propagation and reproduction: either physical love or the exchanging and reproducing of ideas. The greatest knowledge, Diotima says, is knowledge of the "form of beauty", which humans must try to achieve.

When Socrates is nearly done, Alcibiades crashes in, terribly drunk, and delivers an encomium to Socrates himself. No matter how hard he has tried, he says, he has never been able to seduce Socrates, because Socrates has no interest in physical pleasure. Despite this speech, Agathon lies down next to Socrates, much to Alcibiades' chagrin. The party becomes wild and drunken, with the symposium coming to an end. Many of the main characters take the opportunity to depart and return home. Aristodemus goes to sleep. When he wakes up the next morning and prepares to leave the house, Socrates is still awake, proclaiming to Agathon and Aristophanes that a skillful playwright should be able to write comedy as well as tragedy (223d). When Agathon and Aristophanes fall asleep, Socrates rises up and walks to the Lyceum to wash and tend to his daily business as usual, not going home to sleep until that evening (223d).

Phaedrus
Phaedrus opens by citing Hesiod, Acusilaus and Parmenides for the claim that Eros is the oldest of the gods. He confers great benefits, inspiring a lover to earn the admiration of his beloved, for example by showing bravery on the battlefield, since nothing shames a man more than to be seen by his beloved committing an inglorious act (178d–179b). "A handful of such men, fighting side by side, would defeat practically the whole world." Lovers sometimes sacrifice their lives for their beloved. As evidence for this, he mentions some mythological heroes and lovers. Even Achilles, who was the beloved of Patroclus, sacrificed himself to avenge his lover, and Alcestis was willing to die for her husband Admetus.

Phaedrus concludes his short speech in proper rhetorical fashion, reiterating his statements that love is one of the most ancient gods, the most honored, the most powerful in helping men gain honor and blessedness – and sacrificing one's self for love will result in rewards from the gods.

Pausanias

Pausanias, the legal expert of the group, introduces a distinction between a nobler and a baser kind of love, which anticipates Socrates' discourse. The base lover is in search of sexual gratification, and his objects are women and boys. He is inspired by Aphrodite Pandemos (Aphrodite common to the whole city). The noble lover directs his affection towards young men, establishing lifelong relationships, productive of the benefits described by Phaedrus. This love is related to Aphrodite Urania (Heavenly Aphrodite) and is based on honoring one's partner's intelligence and wisdom.

He then analyses the attitudes of different city-states relative to homosexuality. The first distinction he makes is between the cities that clearly establish what is and what is not admitted, and those that are not so explicitly clear, like Athens. In the first group there are cities favorable to homosexuality, like Elis, Boeotia and Sparta, or unfavorable to it like Ionia and Persia. The case of Athens is analyzed with many examples of what would be acceptable and what would not, and at the end, he makes the assertion that Athens' code of behavior favors the nobler type of love and discourages the baser.

Eryximachus
Eryximachus speaks next, though it is Aristophanes' turn, as the latter has not recovered from his hiccups enough to take his place in the sequence. First Eryximachus starts out by claiming that love affects everything in the universe, including plants and animals, believing that once love is attained it should be protected. The god of Love not only directs everything on the human plane, but also on the divine (186b). Two forms of love occur in the human body – one is healthy, the other unhealthy (186bc). Love might be capable of curing the diseased.  Love governs medicine, music, and astronomy (187a), and regulates hot and cold and wet and dry, which when in balance result in health (188a). Eryximachus here evokes the theory of the humor. He concludes: "Love as a whole has ... total ... power ... and is the source of all happiness. It enables us to associate, and be friends, with each other and with the gods" (188d Transl. Gill). He comes across as someone who cannot resist the temptation to praise his own profession: "a good practitioner knows how to treat the body and how to transform its desires" (186d).

Aristophanes
Walter Hamilton regards Aristophanes' speech, which comes next, as one of Plato's most brilliant literary achievements.
The speech has become a focus of subsequent scholarly debate - it is seen sometimes as mere comic relief, and sometimes as satire: the creation myth Aristophanes puts forward to account for sexuality may be read as poking fun at the myths concerning the origins of humanity, numerous in classical Greek mythology.

Before starting his speech, Aristophanes warns the group that his eulogy to love may be more absurd than funny. His speech gives an explanation of why people in love say they feel "whole" when they have found their love-partner. He begins by explaining that people must understand human nature before they can interpret the origins of love and how it affects their own times. This is, he says because in primal times people had doubled bodies, with faces and limbs turned away from one another. As spherical creatures who wheeled around like clowns doing cartwheels (190a), these original people were very powerful. There were three sexes: the all-male, the all-female, and the "androgynous" (half male, half female). The males were said to have descended from the sun, the females from the earth and the androgynous couples from the moon. These creatures tried to scale the heights of  Olympus and planned to set upon the gods (190b-c). Zeus thought about blasting them with thunderbolts but did not want to deprive himself of their devotions and offerings, so he decided to cripple them by chopping them in half, in effect separating each entity's two bodies.

Ever since that time, people run around saying they are looking for their other half because they are really trying to recover their primal nature. The women who were separated from women run after their own kind - whence lesbians. The men split from other men also run after their own kind and love being embraced by other men (191e). Those that come from original androgynous beings are the men and women who engage in heterosexual love. Aristophanes says some people think homosexuals are shameless, but he thinks they are the bravest, most manly of all, as evidenced by the facts: only homosexuals grow up to be politicians (192a), and many heterosexuals are adulterous and unfaithful (191e). Aristophanes then claims that when two people who were separated from each other find each other, they never again want to be separated (192c). This feeling is like a riddle, and cannot be explained. Aristophanes ends on a cautionary note. He says that men should fear the gods, and not neglect to worship them, lest they wield the ax again and we have to go about hopping on one leg, split apart once again (193a). If humans work with the god of Love, they will escape this fate and instead find wholeness.

Agathon
His speech may be regarded as self-consciously poetic and rhetorical, composed in the way of the sophists, gently mocked by Socrates.

Agathon complains that the previous speakers have made the mistake of congratulating mankind on the blessings of love, failing to give due praise to the god himself (194e). He says that love is the youngest of the gods and is an enemy of old age (195b). He says that the god of love shuns the very sight of senility and clings to youth. Agathon says love is dainty and likes to tiptoe through the flowers and never settles where there is no "bud to bloom" (196b). It would seem that none of the characters at the party, with the possible exception of Agathon himself, would be candidates for love's companionship. Socrates, probably the oldest member of the party, seems certain to be ruled out. He also implies that love creates justice, moderation, courage, and wisdom. These are the cardinal virtues in ancient Greece. Although devoid of philosophical content, the speech Plato puts in the mouth of Agathon is a beautiful formal one, and Agathon contributes to the Platonic love theory with the idea that the object of love is beauty.

Socrates
Socrates turns politely to Agathon and, after expressing admiration for his speech, asks whether he could examine his positions further. What follows is a series of questions and answers, typical of Plato's earlier dialogues, featuring Socrates' famous method of dialectics. First, he asks Agathon whether it is reasonable for someone to desire what they already have, like for example someone who is in perfect health to wish he were healthy (200a-e). Agathon agrees with Socrates that this would be irrational, but is quickly reminded of his own definition of Love's true desires: youth and beauty. Putting the two together then, for Love to desire youth he must not have it himself, thus making him old, and for him to desire beauty, he himself must be ugly. Agathon has no choice but to agree.

After this exchange, Socrates switches to storytelling, a departure from the earlier dialogues where he is mostly heard refuting his opponent's arguments through rational debating. Socrates tells of a conversation he had with a woman from Mantinea, called Diotima, who plays the same inquiring/instructing role that Socrates played with Agathon.

Diotima first explains that Love is neither a god, as was previously claimed by the other guests, nor a mortal but a daemon, a spirit halfway between god and man, who was born during a banquet thrown by the gods to celebrate the birth of Aphrodite. One of the guests was Porus, the god of resource or plenty, who was passed out from drinking too much nectar, and it so happened that another deity arrived, Poverty, who came to the banquet to beg, and upon seeing Porus lying unconscious took the chance to sleep with him, conceiving a child in the process: Love. Having been born at Aphrodite's birthday party, he became her follower and servant, but through his real origins Love acquired a kind of double nature. From his mother, Love became poor, ugly, and with no place to sleep (203c-d), while from his father he inherited the knowledge of beauty, as well as the cunningness to pursue it. Being of an intermediary nature, Love is also halfway between wisdom and ignorance, knowing just enough to understand his ignorance and try to overcome it. Beauty then is the perennial philosopher, the "lover of wisdom" (the Greek word "philia" being one of the four words for love).

After describing Love's origins, that provide clues to its nature, Diotima asks Socrates why is it, as he had previously agreed, that love is always that "of beautiful things" (204b). For if love affects everyone indiscriminately, then why is it that only some appear to pursue beauty throughout their lives? Socrates does not have the answer and so Diotima reveals it: Beauty is not the end but the means to something greater, the achievement of a certain reproduction and birth (206c), the only claim that mortals can have on immortality. This is true for men as well as animals that seek an appropriate place to give birth, preferring to roam in pain until they find it. Some men are pregnant in body alone and, just like animals, enjoy the company of women with whom they can have children that will pass on their existence. Others are pregnant in both body and mind, and instead of children they carry wisdom, virtue, and above all, the art of civic order (209a). Beauty is also their guide, but it will be towards the knowledge needed to accomplish their spiritual births.

In conclusion, Diotima gives Socrates a guide on how a man of this class should be brought up from a young age. First, he should start by loving a particular body he finds beautiful, but as time goes by, he will relax his passion and pass to the love of all bodies. From this point, he will pass to the love of beautiful minds, and then to that of knowledge. Finally, he will reach the ultimate goal, which is to witness beauty in itself, rather than representations (211a-b), the true Form of Beauty in Platonic terms.

This speech, in the interpretation of Marsilio Ficino in De Amore (1484), is the origin of the concept of Platonic love.

Alcibiades

Entering upon the scene late and inebriated, Alcibiades pays tribute to Socrates. Like Agathon and Aristophanes, Alcibiades is a historical person from ancient Athens. A year after the events of the Symposium, his political enemies would drive him to flee Athens under fear of being sentenced to death for sacrilege and turn traitor to the Spartans. By his own admission, he is very handsome.

Finding himself seated on a couch with Socrates and Agathon, Alcibiades exclaims that Socrates, again, has managed to sit next to the most handsome man in the room. Socrates asks Agathon to protect him from the jealous rage of Alcibiades, asking Alcibiades to forgive him (213d). Wondering why everyone seems sober, Alcibiades is informed of the night's agreement (213e, c); after Socrates was ending his drunken ramblings, Alcibiades hopes that no one will believe a word Socrates was talking about, Alcibiades proposes to offer an encomium to Socrates (214c-e).

Alcibiades begins by comparing Socrates to a statue of Silenus; the statue is ugly and hollow, and inside it is full of tiny golden statues of the gods (215a-b). Alcibiades then compares Socrates to a satyr. Satyrs were often portrayed with the sexual appetite, manners, and features of wild beasts, and often with a large erection.

Alcibiades states that when he hears Socrates speak, he feels overwhelmed. The words of Socrates are the only ones to have ever upset him so deeply that his soul started to realize that his aristocratic life was no better than a slave's (215e). Socrates is the only man who has ever made Alcibiades feel shame (216b). Yet all this is the least of it (216c) – Alcibiades was intrigued to allow himself to follow Socrates (216d). Most people, he continues, do not know what Socrates is like on the inside:

He was deeply curious towards Socrates' intelligence and wisdom, but Alcibiades really wanted him sexually at the time that Socrates, a man that gave only platonic love to everyone he has encountered, gave up teaching everything he knew towards Alcibiades because of his pride, lust, and immoral conduct upon him(217a). Yet Socrates made no move, and Alcibiades began to pursue Socrates "as if I were the lover and he my young prey!" (217c). When Socrates continually rebuffed him, Alcibiades began to fantasize a view towards Socrates as the only true and worthy lover he had ever had. So he told Socrates that it seemed to him now that nothing could be more important than becoming the best man he could be, and Socrates was best fit to help him reach that aim (218c-d). Socrates responded that if he did have this power, why would he exchange his true (inner) beauty for the image of beauty that Alcibiades would provide. Furthermore, Alcibiades was wrong and Socrates knows there is no use in him (218e–219a). Alcibiades spent the night sleeping beside Socrates yet, in his deep humiliation, Alcibiades made no sexual attempt (219b-d).

In his speech, Alcibiades goes on to describe Socrates' virtues, his incomparable valour in battle, his immunity to cold or fear. On one occasion he even saved Alcibiades' life and then refused to accept honours for it (219e–221c). Socrates, he concludes, is unique in his ideas and accomplishments, unrivaled by any man from the past or present (221c).

Authors and works cited in the Symposium
 Acusilaus
 Aeschylus
 Aristophanes, The Clouds
 Euripides, Melanippe
 Heraclitus
 Hesiod, Theogony
 Homer, Cypria, Iliad
 Parmenides
 Prodicus of Ceos, Praise of Heracles
 unspecified (likely lost) philosophical discourse on the utility of Salt

See also
 Platonic love
 Xenophon's Symposium
 Diotima of Mantinea
 Erik Satie's Socrate
 "The Origin of Love", a song from Hedwig and the Angry Inch
 Symposium
 Greek love
 Bernstein's Serenade after "Symposium"
 Stages on Life's Way, a book which includes In Vino Veritas, Søren Kierkegaard's dialogue on love based on Symposium

References

Sources
 Arieti, James A. Interpreting Plato: The Dialogues As Drama. Rowman & Littlefield Publishers (1991). 
 Cobb, William S., "The Symposium" in The Symposium and the Phaedrus: Plato's Erotic Dialogues, State Univ of New York Pr (1993). .
 Leitao, David D., The Pregnant Male as Myth and Metaphor in Classical Greek Literature, Cambridge Univ Pr (2012). 
 Nussbaum, Martha C. The Fragility of Goodness: Luck and Ethics in Greek Tragedy and Philosophy. Cambridge University Press (2001). 

Current texts, translations, commentaries
 Plato, The Symposium, trans. by W. Hamilton. Harmondsworth: Penguin, 1951.
 Plato, The Symposium, Greek text with commentary by Kenneth Dover. Cambridge: Cambridge University Press, 1980. .
 Plato, The Symposium, Greek text with trans. by Tom Griffith. Berkeley: University of California Press, 1989. .
 Plato, The Symposium, trans. with commentary by R. E. Allen. New Haven: Yale University Press, 1993. .
 Plato, The Symposium, trans. by Christopher Gill. London: Penguin, 2003. .
 Plato, The Symposium, trans. by Alexander Nehamas and Paul Woodruff (from Plato: Complete Works, ed. by John M. Cooper,  pp. 457–506. ); available separately: .
 Plato, The Symposium, trans. by Robin Waterfield. Oxford: Oxford University Press, 1998. .
 Plato, The Symposium, trans. by Avi Sharon. Newburyport, MA: Focus Publishing, 1998. .
 Plato, The Symposium, trans. by Seth Benardete with essays by Seth Benardete and Allan Bloom. Chicago: University of Chicago Press, 2001. .
 Plato, The Symposium, trans. by Percy Bysshe Shelley, Provincetown, Pagan Press, 2001, .
 Plato, The Symposium, trans. by M. C. Howatson edited by Frisbee C. C. Sheffield, Cambridge University Press, 2008, 

Online translations
 StandardEbooks: Symposium by Plato, trans. by Benjamin Jowett* The Internet Classics Archive: Symposium by Plato, trans. by Benjamin Jowett
 Project Gutenberg: Symposium by Plato, trans. by Benjamin Jowett
 Perseus Digital Library : Symposium by Plato, trans. by Harold N. Fowler with facing Greek text ed. by Burnet (optional).
 G. Theodoridis, 2015: full-text translation

Further reading
 Blondell, Ruby and Luc Brisson and others, Plato's Symposium: Issues in Interpretation and Reception. Center for Hellenic Studies, 2007. .
 
 Hunter, Richard, Plato's Symposium (Oxford Approaches to Classical Literature). Oxford: Oxford University Press, 2004. .
 Lilar, Suzanne, Le Couple (1963), Paris, Grasset;  Translated as Aspects of Love in Western Society in 1965, with a foreword by Jonathan Griffin, New York, McGraw-Hill, .
 Lilar, Suzanne (1967), A propos de Sartre et de l'amour Paris: Grasset.
 Scott, Gary Alan, and William A. Welton, "Erotic Wisdom: philosophy and intermediacy in Plato's Symposium". State University of New York Press, 2008. .
 Sheffield, Frisbee (2009), Plato's Symposium: The Ethics of Desire (Oxford Classical Monograph)
 Strauss, Leo, Leo Strauss on Plato's Symposium. Chicago: University of Chicago Press, 2001. 
 Worthen, Thomas D., "Socrates and Aristodemos, the automaton agathoi of the Symposium: Gentlemen go to parties on their own say-so," New England Classical Journal 26.5 (1999), 15–21.
 Thucydides, History of the Peloponnesian War, trans. Rex Warner. Penguin, 1954.

External links

 
 English translation of Plato's Symposium by Benjamin Jowett at Gutenberg.
 Longer summary of the Symposium by Glyn Hughes
  English translation by Harold N. Fowler linked to commentary by R. G. Bury and others
 Angela Hobbs' podcast interview on Erotic Love in the Symposium 
 Approaching Plato: A Guide to the Early and Middle Dialogues
 
 BBC In Our Time: Plato's Symposium. (Radio programme discussing the Symposium)
 

Dialogues of Plato
LGBT history in Greece
Ancient LGBT history
Books about the philosophy of love
Social philosophy literature
Gay male literature
Fiction set in the 5th century BC